Cristiano Marcolino Santos (born 17 March 1989), knows as Cristiano Sergipano, is a Brazilian footballer who plays as a forward.

References

External links

Cristiano Sergipano at ZeroZero

1988 births
Living people
Brazilian footballers
Brazilian expatriate footballers
Ypiranga Futebol Clube players
Guarany Futebol Clube players
Araripina Futebol Clube players
Serra Talhada Futebol Clube players
Clube Recreativo e Atlético Catalano players
Globo Futebol Clube players
Masfout Club players
Kelantan FA players
Al Dhaid SC players
Hassania Agadir players
Club Sportivo Sergipe players
Angkor Tiger FC players
Botola players
Malaysia Super League players
Campeonato Brasileiro Série C players
Association football forwards
Brazilian expatriate sportspeople in the United Arab Emirates
Brazilian expatriate sportspeople in Morocco
Brazilian expatriate sportspeople in Malaysia
Expatriate footballers in the United Arab Emirates
Expatriate footballers in Morocco
Expatriate footballers in Malaysia
Expatriate footballers in Cambodia
Brazilian expatriate sportspeople in Cambodia